Marko Spittka (born 22 April 1971 in Dresden, Sachsen) is a German judoka. He won a bronze medal in the half-lightweight (–86 kg) division at the 1996 Summer Olympics.

References

External links
 
 
 
 

1971 births
Living people
German male judoka
Judoka at the 1996 Summer Olympics
Judoka at the 2000 Summer Olympics
Olympic judoka of Germany
Olympic bronze medalists for Germany
Sportspeople from Dresden
Olympic medalists in judo
Medalists at the 1996 Summer Olympics